The 4th Artistic Gymnastics World Championships were held in Luxembourg, in conjunction with the 9th Federal Festival of Luxembourg, on August 1, 1909.

Medal table 

Note
Official FIG documents credit medals earned by athletes from Bohemia as medals for Czechoslovakia. Medals earned by athletes from Austria-Hungary are officially credited as medals for Yugoslavia.

Men's individual all around

Men's team all around

Men's rings

Men's parallel bars

Men's horizontal bar

References 

World Artistic Gymnastics Championships
G
World Artistic Gymnastics Championships, 1909
G